22nd CDG Awards
January 28, 2020

Contemporary: 
Knives Out

Period: 
Jojo Rabbit

Sci-Fi/Fantasy: 
Maleficent: Mistress of Evil
The 22nd Costume Designers Guild Awards, honoring the best costume designs in film, television, and media for 2019, took place on January 28, 2020. The nominees were announced on December 10, 2019.

Winners and nominees

Film

Excellence in Contemporary Film
''Knives Out — Jenny EaganA Beautiful Day in the Neighborhood — Arjun Bhasin
Hustlers — Mitchell Travers
The Laundromat — Ellen Mirojnick
Queen & Slim — Shiona Turini

Excellence in Period FilmJojo Rabbit — Mayes C. RubeoDolemite Is My Name — Ruth E. Carter
Downton Abbey — Anna Mary Scott Robbins
Once Upon a Time in Hollywood — Arianne Phillips
Rocketman — Julian Day

Excellence in Sci-Fi/Fantasy FilmMaleficent: Mistress of Evil — Ellen MirojnickAladdin — Michael Wilkinson
Avengers: Endgame — Judianna Makovsky
Captain Marvel — Sanja M. Hays
Star Wars: The Rise of Skywalker — Michael Kaplan

Television
Excellence in Contemporary TelevisionSchitt's Creek (Episode: "The Dress") — Debra HansonBig Little Lies (Episode: "She Knows") — Alix Friedberg
Fleabag (Episode: "2.1") — Ray Holman
Killing Eve (Episode: "Desperate Times") — Charlotte Mitchell
Russian Doll (Episode: "Superiority Complex") — Jennifer Rogien

Excellence in Period TelevisionThe Marvelous Mrs. Maisel (Episode: "It's Comedy or Cabbage") — Donna ZakowskaChernobyl (Episode: "Please Remain Calm") — Odile Dicks-Mireaux
The Crown (Episode: "Cri De Coeur") — Amy Roberts
Fosse/Verdon (Episode: "Life is a Cabaret") — Melissa Toth and Joseph La Corte
GLOW (Episode: "Freaky Tuesday") — Beth Morgan

Excellence in Sci-Fi/Fantasy TelevisionGame of Thrones (Episode: "The Iron Throne") — Michele ClaptonCarnival Row (Episode: "Aisling") — Joanna Eatwell
The Handmaid's Tale (Episode: "Household") — Natalie Bronfman
A Series of Unfortunate Events (Episode: "Penultimate Peril: Part 2") — Cynthia Summers
Watchmen (Episode: "It's Summer and We're Running Out of Ice") — Sharen Davis

Excellence in Variety, Reality-Competition, Live TelevisionThe Masked Singer (Episode: "Season Finale: And the Winner Takes It All and Takes It Off") — Marina ToybinaDancing with the Stars (Episode: "First Elimination") — Daniela Gschwendtner and Steven Norman Lee
The Late Late Show with James Corden (Episode: "Crosswalk the Musical: Aladdin") — Lauren Shapiro
RuPaul's Drag Race (Episode: "Whatcha Unpackin?") — Zaldy
Saturday Night Live (Episode: "Sandra Oh/Tame Impala") — Tom Broecker and Eric Justian

Short Form
Excellence in Short Form DesignUnited Airlines: "Star Wars Wing Walker" commercial — Christopher Lawrence
Katy Perry: "Small Talk" music video — Phoenix Mellow
Kohler Verdera Voice Smart Mirror: "Mirror, Mirror" commercial — Ami Goodheart
Lil Nas X: "Old Town Road" music video — Catherine Hahn
Madonna: "God Control" music video — B. Åkerlund

Career Achievement Award
Michael Kaplan

Spotlight Award
Charlize Theron

Distinguished Collaborator Award
Adam McKay

Distinguished Service Award
Mary Ellen Fields

References

Costume Designers Guild Awards
2020 film awards
2020 television awards
2019 in fashion
2019 in American cinema
2019 in American television